New Improved Funk is an album by American jazz guitarist George Freeman recorded in 1973 and released on the Groove Merchant label.

Reception 

Allmusic's Jason Ankeny said: "It's a fun house ride that veers sharply from funk to jazz to soul and back again, its scattershot approach nevertheless proves the best showcase George Freeman's guitar ever had. ... Somehow this mess still comes together, galvanized by Von Freeman's fiery tenor sax and its undeniably impressive gutbucket grooves. Everything that it's advertised to be".

Track listing
All compositions by George Freeman except where noted.
 "New Improved Funk" – 2:26
 "Daffy" – 3:34
 "Happy Fingers" – 4:30
 "All in the Game" (Charles G. Dawes, Carl Sigman) – 4:31
 "Big Finish" – 6:25
 "Guitar Lover Man" – 3:16
 "Good Morning Heartache" (Irene Higginbotham, Ervin Drake, Dan Fisher) – 5:02
 "Some Enchanted Evening" (Richard Rodgers, Oscar Hammerstein II) – 5:12		
 "Confirmed Truth" – 4:14

Personnel
George Freeman – guitar
Von Freeman – tenor saxophone
John Young − piano (tracks 3–5)
Bobby Blevins – organ (tracks 1, 2 & 6–8)
LeRoy Jackson – bass
Marion Booker (tracks 1, 2 & 6–8), Bob Guthrie (tracks 3–5) – drums

References

Groove Merchant albums
George Freeman (guitarist) albums
1973 albums
Albums produced by Sonny Lester